Christian Scaroni (born 16 October 1997) is an Italian cyclist, who currently rides for UCI WorldTeam .

Major results

2015
 1st  Road race, National Junior Road Championships
2018
 2nd Giro del Belvedere
 3rd Overall Toscana-Terra di Ciclismo
 3rd Gran Premio Industrie del Marmo
 4th Road race, UEC European Under–23 Road Championships
2019
 1st  Mountains classification, Tour de Normandie
 2nd Overall Tour du Jura Cycliste
1st  Young rider classification
2021
 1st  Mountains classification, Giro di Sicilia
 9th Trofeo Serra de Tramuntana
 10th Veneto Classic
2022
 Adriatica Ionica Race
1st  Points classification
1st Stages 1 & 5
 7th Coppa Bernocchi

References

External links
 

1997 births
Living people
Italian male cyclists
Cyclists from Brescia
Competitors at the 2018 Mediterranean Games
Mediterranean Games competitors for Italy